The Yamaha TZ750 is a series production two-stroke race motorcycle built by Yamaha to compete in the Formula 750 class in the 1970s. Motorcyclist called it "the most notorious and successful roadracing motorcycle of the 1970s". Another journal called it the dominant motorcycle of the era, noting its nine consecutive Daytona 200 wins, starting in 1974.

This is also the fastest recorded lap of the Mountain Course by a Yamaha 750cc two-stroke machine.

It was rated by journalist Kevin Cameron as one of the five most influential motorcycle designs: its monoshock suspension, high-strength frame and wide tires were necessary to handle the high engine output, and became standard for sportbikes.

Twin TZ750 engines powered the Silver Bird motorcycle land-speed record setting streamliner motorcycle, the first to break .

Specifications

Museum examples
A 1974 example is displayed in the Communication Plaza at the corporate headquarters of the Yamaha Motor Company in Iwata, Shizuoka, Japan. Another 1974 TZ750A is at the Barber Vintage Motorsports Museum in Alabama.

References

Sources

Further reading

External links

TZ750
Motorcycles introduced in 1974